Lithocarpus jacobsii is a tree in the beech family Fagaceae. It is named for the Dutch botanist Marius Jacobs.  Trees in Lithocarpus are commonly known as the stone oaks and differ from Quercus primarily because they produce insect-pollinated flowers.

Description
The brown bark is smooth or lenticellate. The coriaceous leaves are unusual and distinctive because of their cordate base that often seems to clasp the stem on a short petiole.

The infructescence can be quite long with numerous clusters of fruit scattered along the rachis. The fruits are generally in clusters of 3 (and up to 10). The cupules only cover the lower part of the nut and have squamose scales arranging loosely in cyclical series.

Distribution and habitat
Lithocarpus jacobsii is endemic to Borneo. Its habitat is mixed dipterocarp to lower montane forests up to  altitude.

 
 https://www.inaturalist.org/observations?place_id=any&taxon_id=1051103

References

jacobsii
Endemic flora of Borneo
Trees of Borneo
Plants described in 1970
Flora of the Borneo lowland rain forests
Flora of the Borneo montane rain forests